Paitchau (also Gunung Paitchau, or Paitchao, or Paitxau; locally, Pai Tekau Ile) is a mountain in the Tutuala subdistrict, Lautém District of East Timor. Situated within Nino Konis Santana National Park, it is south of Lake Ira Lalaro. Though part of a mountain chain, Paitchau is an isolated mountain in the southern Sucos Mehara. The area contained within the Paitchau Range and Ira Lalaro is sparsely populated and contains several unique faunal and floral species.

Geography
Paitchau is a sharp peak, prominent from the southwest. The hill range is located in the extreme eastern part of Timor-Leste and it slopes towards the coastline of Lore and Silvicola which have coral reefs. The area is thinly populated and has diverse flora and fauna. Its slopes are steep and the southern part of the range towards the coast is thickly forested.

Flora and fauna
Paitchau is characterized by tropical moist deciduous lowland forest and tropical mixed evergreen forest. There is swamp land around Ira Lalaro. Paitchau is said to contain "the best remaining 'primary’ forest" in the country.

Fauna

Avifauna
There are 24 restricted-range species (listed below) in the Important Bird Area which includes the endangered Treron psittaceus (Timor green-pigeon), and the critically endangered Cacatua sulphurea (yellow-crested cockatoo).

Critically endangered 
Yellow-crested cockatoo (Cacatua sulphurea)

Endangered
Timor green-pigeon (Treron psittaceus)

Near threatened
Slaty cuckoo-dove (Turacoena modesta)
Pink-headed imperial-pigeon (Ducula rosacea)
Spot-breasted white-eye (Heleia muelleri)
Orange-banded thrush (Zoothera peronii)
White-bellied bushchat (Saxicola gutturalis)
Black-banded flycatcher (Ficedula timorensis)
Olive-shouldered parrot (Aprosmictus jonquillaceus)
Cinnamon-banded kingfisher (Todiramphus australasia)

Least concern
Dusky cuckoo-dove (Macropygia magna)
Streaky-breasted honeyeater (Meliphaga reticulata)
Plain friarbird (Philemon inornatu)
Yellow-eared honeyeater (Lichmera flavicans)
Red-rumped myzomela (Myzomela vulnerata)
Plain gerygone (Gerygone inornata)
Fawn-breasted whistler (Pachycephala orpheus)
Timor figbird (Sphecotheres viridis)
Olive-brown oriole (Oriolus melanotis)
Timor stubtail (Urosphena subulata)
Timor leaf-warbler (Phylloscopus presbytes)
Timor blue-flycatcher  (Cyornis hyacinthinus)
Red-chested flowerpecker (Dicaeum maugei)
Flame-breasted sunbird (Nectarinia solaris)
Tricoloured parrotfinch (Erythrura tricolor)

References

Bibliography

Mountains of East Timor
Important Bird Areas of East Timor